David Bruce Cassidy (April 12, 1950 – November 21, 2017) was an American actor, singer, songwriter, and guitarist. He was best known for his role as Keith Partridge, the son of Shirley Partridge (played by his stepmother, Shirley Jones), in the 1970s musical-sitcom The Partridge Family. This role catapulted Cassidy to teen idol status as a superstar pop singer of the 1970s.

Early life
Cassidy was born at Flower Fifth Avenue Hospital in New York City, the son of singer and actor Jack Cassidy and actress Evelyn Ward. His father was of half Irish and half German ancestry, and his mother was descended mostly from Colonial Americans, along with having some Irish and Swiss roots. His mother's ancestors were among the founders of Newark, New Jersey.

As his parents were frequently touring on the road, he spent his early years being raised by his maternal grandparents in a middle-class neighborhood in West Orange, New Jersey. In 1956, he found out from neighbors' children that his parents had been divorced for over two years and had not told him.

In 1956, Cassidy's father married singer and actress Shirley Jones. They had three children, David's half-brothers Shaun (b. 1958), Patrick (b. 1962), and Ryan (b. 1966). In 1968, after completing one final session of summer school to obtain credits necessary to get a high school diploma, David moved into the rental home of Jack Cassidy and Shirley Jones in Irvington, New York, where his half-brothers also lived. David remained there, seeking fame as an actor/musician, while simultaneously working half-days in the mailroom of a textile firm. He moved out when his career began to flourish.

Cassidy's father, Jack, is credited with setting his son up with his first manager. After David Cassidy signed with Universal Studios in 1969, Jack introduced him to former table tennis champion and close friend Ruth Aarons, who later found her niche as a talent manager, given her theater background. Aarons had represented Jack and Shirley Jones for several years and later represented Cassidy's half-brother Shaun. Aarons became an authority figure and close friend to Cassidy and was the driving force behind his on-screen success. After Cassidy made small wages from Screen Gems for his work on The Partridge Family during season one, Aarons discovered that he had been underage when he signed his contract; she then renegotiated the contract with far superior provisions and a rare four-year term.

Career

1960s
On January 2, 1969, Cassidy made his professional debut in the Broadway musical The Fig Leaves Are Falling. It closed after four performances, but a casting director saw the show and asked Cassidy to make a screen test. In 1969, he moved to Los Angeles. After signing with Universal Studios in 1969, Cassidy was featured in episodes of the television series Ironside, Marcus Welby, M.D., Adam-12, Medical Center, and Bonanza.

1970s

In 1970, Cassidy took the role of Keith Partridge on the musical television show The Partridge Family. After demonstrating his singing talent, Cassidy was allowed to join the studio ensemble as the lead singer. (He and Shirley Jones were the only TV cast members to appear on any Partridge Family recordings.)

The show proved popular, but the fame took its toll on Cassidy. In the midst of his rise to fame, Cassidy felt stifled by the show and trapped by the mass hysteria surrounding his every move. In May 1972, to alter his public image, he appeared nude on the cover of Rolling Stone in a cropped Annie Leibovitz photo; among other things, the accompanying Rolling Stone article mentioned that Cassidy was riding around New York in the back of a car "stoned and drunk."

Once "I Think I Love You"—the first single released by The Partridge Family pop group—became a hit, Cassidy began work on solo albums, including Cherish and Rock Me Baby, both released in 1972. Within the first year, he had produced his own single, a cover of The Association's "Cherish" (from the album of the same title); the song reached number nine in the United States, number two in the United Kingdom (a double A-side with "Could It Be Forever"), and number one in Australia and New Zealand. He began tours that featured Partridge tunes and his own hits.

Cassidy achieved far greater solo chart success in the UK than in his native America, including a cover of The Young Rascals' "How Can I Be Sure" and the double A-side single "Daydreamer" / "The Puppy Song" – a UK number one which failed to chart in the States. In Britain, Cassidy the solo star remains best known for "Daydreamer", "How Can I Be Sure" and "Could It Be Forever" (UK number 2/US number 37), all released during his 1972–73 solo chart peak.

After launching his solo musical career, he was for a short time the highest paid entertainer in the world. At the peak of his career, Cassidy's fan club was larger than that of any other pop star, including The Beatles or Elvis Presley. A fictionalized version of him starred in the fan magazine David Cassidy. Many of its issues were signed by Turkish comics creator Su Gumen. In a 1993 interview, Cassidy said that he was frustrated by his portrayal in the magazines, which sanitized his image. His fanclub nicknamed a star after him in the International Star Registry in 1983. In his autobiography, Cassidy said that he felt overwhelmed by his fanbase, and said that "it became impossible for me to go in a store or even walk down the street without being stopped by people."

Though he wanted to become a respected rock musician along the lines of Mick Jagger, his channel to stardom launched him into the ranks of teen idol, a brand he loathed until much later in life, when he managed to come to terms with his pop idol beginnings. Ten albums by The Partridge Family and five solo albums by Cassidy were produced during the series, with most selling more than a million copies each. Internationally, Cassidy's solo career eclipsed the already phenomenal success of The Partridge Family. He became an instant drawing card, with sellout concert successes in major arenas around the world. These concerts produced mass hysteria, resulting in the media coining the term "Cassidymania". For example, he played to two sellout crowds of 56,000 each at the Houston Astrodome in Texas over one weekend in 1972. His concert in New York's Madison Square Garden sold out in one day and resulted in riots after the show. His concert tours of the United Kingdom included sellout concerts at Wembley Stadium in 1973. In Australia in 1974, the mass hysteria was such that calls were made to have him deported from the country, especially after the madness at his 33,000-person audience concert at Melbourne Cricket Ground.

A turning point in Cassidy's live concerts (while still filming The Partridge Family) was a gate stampede at the penultimate show on a world tour, in London's White City Stadium on May 26, 1974, when nearly 800 people were injured in a crush at the front of the stage. Thirty were taken to the hospital, and a 14-year-old girl, Bernadette Whelan, died four days later at London's Hammersmith Hospital without regaining consciousness. 

A deeply affected Cassidy faced the press, trying to make sense of what had happened. Out of respect for the family and to avoid turning the girl's funeral into a media circus, Cassidy did not attend the service, although he spoke to Whelan's parents and sent flowers. Cassidy stated at the time that this would haunt him until the day he died.

By this point, Cassidy had decided to quit both touring and acting in The Partridge Family, concentrating instead on recording and songwriting. International success continued, mostly in Great Britain, Germany, Japan and South Africa, when he released three well-received solo albums and several hit singles on RCA in 1975 and 1976. Cassidy became the first recording artist to have a hit with "I Write the Songs", peaking at No. 11 in the Top 30 in Great Britain before the song became Barry Manilow's signature tune. Cassidy co-produced the recording with the song's author-composer, Bruce Johnston of The Beach Boys. The two artists collaborated on two of David's mid-70s RCA Records albums The Higher They Climb and Home Is Where the Heart Is.

In 1978, Cassidy starred in an episode of Police Story titled "A Chance to Live", for which he was nominated for an Emmy Award. NBC created a series based on it, called David Cassidy: Man Undercover, but it was cancelled after one season. A decade later, the successful Fox series 21 Jump Street used the same plot, with different youthful-looking police officers infiltrating a high school.

1980s
Cassidy later stated he was broke by the 1980s, despite being successful and highly paid. In 1985, music success continued with the Arista release of the single "The Last Kiss" (number six in the United Kingdom), with backing vocals by George Michael, which was included on the album Romance. These went gold in Europe and Australia, and Cassidy supported them with a sellout tour of the United Kingdom, which resulted in the Greatest Hits Live compilation of 1986. Michael cited Cassidy as a major career influence and interviewed Cassidy for David Litchfield's Ritz Newspaper.

Cassidy performed in musical theater. In 1981, he toured in a revival of a pre-Broadway production of Little Johnny Jones, a show originally produced in 1904 with music, lyrics, and book by George M. Cohan. (The show is excerpted in the biographic film Yankee Doodle Dandy [1942], when James Cagney sings "Give My Regards to Broadway" and "The Yankee Doodle Boy".) However, Cassidy received negative reviews, and he was replaced by another former teen idol, Donny Osmond, before the show reached Broadway. Cassidy, in turn, was himself a replacement for the lead in the original 1982 Broadway production of Joseph and the Amazing Technicolor Dreamcoat. Cassidy also appeared in London's West End production of Time and returned to Broadway in Blood Brothers alongside Petula Clark and David's half-brother Shaun Cassidy.

Later career

Cassidy returned to the American top 40 with his 1990 single "Lyin' to Myself", released on Enigma Records, from his 1990 album David Cassidy, followed by the 1992 album Didn't You Used to Be... on Scotti Brothers Records. In 1998, he had an adult contemporary music hit with "No Bridge I Wouldn't Cross" from his album Old Trick New Dog on his own Slamajama Records label.

From November 1996 to December 1998, Cassidy starred in the Las Vegas show EFX at the MGM Grand Las Vegas. In 2000, Cassidy wrote and appeared in the Las Vegas show At the Copa with Sheena Easton, as both the young and old versions of the lead character, Johnny Flamingo. His 2001 album Then and Now went platinum internationally and returned Cassidy to the top five of the UK album charts for the first time since 1974. In 2005, Cassidy played the manager of Aaron Carter's character in the film Popstar. He co-starred alongside his half-brother Patrick in a short-lived 2009 ABC Family comedy series titled Ruby & The Rockits, a show created by Shaun.

Cassidy was one of the contestants on Celebrity Apprentice in 2011.

As the days of "Cassidymania" subsided, Cassidy regularly addressed fans at his concerts in question-and-answer sessions. In August 2016, Cassidy performed in The Villages, Florida, and brought multiple attendees to the side of the stage, asking and answering questions and engaging with members of the community who had been fans for nearly half a century.

Personal life
Cassidy's first wife was actress Kay Lenz, whom he married on April 3, 1977, and divorced on December 28, 1983.

Cassidy married his second wife, horse breeder Meryl Tanz, in 1984.  They met in 1974 at a horse sale in Lexington, Kentucky. This marriage ended in divorce in 1988.

Cassidy's daughter, actress Katie Cassidy, was born in 1986 from an extramarital affair with fashion model Sherry Williams. After David and Williams ended their relationship, Katie was raised by her mother and her stepfather, Richard Benedon. David spoke of his absence from Katie's life; in February 2017, he said, "I've never had a relationship with her. I wasn't her father. I was her biological father but I didn't raise her. She has a completely different life. I'm proud of her. She's very talented. It's hard for me to even accept how old she is now."

Cassidy married Sue Shifrin on March 30, 1991. It was Cassidy's third marriage and Shifrin's second marriage. They had one child, Beau, in 1991. In August 2013, Cassidy's Los Angeles publicist confirmed that the couple had separated, with Shifrin filing for divorce in February 2014.

Cassidy moved to Fort Lauderdale, Florida, in 2002. He filed for bankruptcy in 2015.

Activism
In 2011, Cassidy recorded a public service announcement for Alzheimer's disease research and prevention – due to his mother, Evelyn Ward, having the condition – and said that he would campaign for that cause whenever possible. He planned to address Congress in 2012.

Cassidy was a long-time registered Democrat. During a 2012 guest appearance on The Colbert Report he expressed his views on the leading Republican candidates for president, Mitt Romney and Newt Gingrich. Cassidy stated, "I believe both of them are the most embarrassing, sad, pathetic  ... I mean, really, this is the best we can do?"

Alcohol-related driving incidents and criminal charges
Cassidy was arrested for driving under the influence (DUI) in Florida on November 3, 2010.

Cassidy was arrested for DUI in Schodack, New York, in the early hours of August 21, 2013. He was pulled over after failing to dim his headlights as he passed a police car going in the opposite direction. After performing poorly on a field sobriety test, Cassidy was subjected to an alcohol breath test, returning a blood alcohol level of 0.10%, which was above the New York legal limit of 0.08%. The arresting officer, one Tom Jones, reported that Cassidy was polite and courteous; in reference to a 1965 hit song by singer Tom Jones, Cassidy jokingly asked the officer, "What's New, Pussycat?" Cassidy was charged, taken to jail, and released several hours later on $2,500 bail. On May 12, 2015, Cassidy was sentenced to community service, a fine, and a six-month license suspension.

Cassidy was arrested on suspicion of DUI in California on January 10, 2014, after he made an illegal right turn against a red light. He was held overnight in jail, ordered to undergo inpatient rehabilitation, and placed on probation for five years.

On September 9, 2015, Cassidy was cited in Fort Lauderdale, Florida, on charges of leaving the scene of a car accident, improper lane change, expired tags and driving on a suspended license.

Illness and death

In 2008, Cassidy publicly admitted he had an alcohol problem.

On February 20, 2017, following a performance in Agoura Hills, California, in which Cassidy had difficulty remembering the lyrics of songs he had been performing for nearly 50 years, and appeared to fall off the stage, he announced that he was living with dementia and was retiring from all further performing. He said that his mother and grandfather had also suffered from dementia at the end of their lives, and that "I was in denial, but a part of me always knew this was coming."
 
Later in 2017, Cassidy fell ill at a recording studio and was hospitalized. In a later phone conversation with an A&E producer, he stated that he had just met with his doctor, that he had liver disease, and that his life had "changed dramatically." Cassidy added that he had been unconscious and near death for the first few days after the incident, but that his memory had returned. Cassidy also acknowledged that there was "no sign of [dementia] at this stage of [his] life," adding that "[it] was complete alcohol poisoning—and the fact is, I lied about my drinking." Cassidy said, "You know, I did it to myself, man. I did it to myself to cover up the sadness and the emptiness." Cassidy had told his family and others that he had given up drinking.

On November 18, 2017, Cassidy was hospitalized with liver and kidney failure, and was critically ill in a medically induced coma. He came out of the coma two days later, remaining in critical but stable condition. Doctors hoped to keep Cassidy stable until a liver became available for transplant, but he died of liver failure on November 21, 2017, at the age of 67. According to his daughter, Katie Cassidy, his final words were "So much wasted time."

Memoirs
In 1994, Cassidy, in collaboration with Chip Deffaa, wrote his autobiography C'mon, Get Happy ... Fear and Loathing on the Partridge Family Bus.  In December 2019, C'mon, Get Happy was published as an E-book (by Open Road Media) with a new afterword by Chip Deffaa, covering the rest of Cassidy's life.

Cassidy also wrote a memoir, Could It Be Forever? My Story, published in the United Kingdom in March 2007, which gives further details about his personal life.

Discography

Filmography

References

External links

 David Cassidy's official web site
 
 
 
 
 
 The David Cassidy Collection is held by the Victoria and Albert Museum Theatre and Performance Department.

1950 births
2017 deaths
20th-century American guitarists
20th-century American male actors
20th-century American singers
20th-century American male singers
21st-century American male actors
21st-century American singers
21st-century American male singers
Alcohol-related deaths in Florida
Alexander Hamilton High School (Los Angeles) alumni
American male child actors
American male film actors
American male guitarists
American male singer-songwriters
American male television actors
American people of German descent
American people of Irish descent
American pop guitarists
American rock guitarists
American rock keyboardists
Bell Records artists
Deaths from kidney failure
Deaths from liver failure
Guitarists from Los Angeles
Guitarists from New York City
Male actors from Los Angeles
Male actors from New York City
New Jersey Democrats
New York (state) Democrats
Participants in American reality television series
People from Ridgefield, Connecticut
People from West Orange, New Jersey
RCA Records artists
Scotti Brothers Records artists
Singer-songwriters from California
Singer-songwriters from New Jersey
The Apprentice (franchise) contestants
University High School (Los Angeles) alumni
Singer-songwriters from New York (state)
Singer-songwriters from Connecticut